In mathematics, the rational normal curve is a smooth, rational curve  of degree  in projective n-space . It is a simple example of a projective variety; formally, it is the Veronese variety when the domain is the projective line. For  it is the plane conic  and for  it is the twisted cubic. The term "normal" refers to projective normality, not normal schemes. The intersection of the rational normal curve with an affine space is called the moment curve.

Definition
The rational normal curve may be given parametrically as the image of the map

which assigns to the homogeneous coordinates  the value

In the affine coordinates of the chart  the map is simply

That is, the rational normal curve is the closure by a single point at infinity of the affine curve

Equivalently, rational normal curve may be understood to be a projective variety, defined as the common zero locus of the homogeneous polynomials

The full set of these polynomials is not needed; it is sufficient to pick  of these to specify the curve.

Alternate parameterization
Then the polynomial

is a homogeneous polynomial of degree  with distinct roots. The polynomials

are then a basis for the space of homogeneous polynomials of degree . The map

or, equivalently, dividing by 

is a rational normal curve. That this is a rational normal curve may be understood by noting that the monomials

are just one possible basis for the space of degree  homogeneous polynomials.  In fact, any basis will do. This is just an application of the statement that any two projective varieties are projectively equivalent if they are congruent modulo the projective linear group  (with  the field over which the projective space is defined).

Conversely, any rational normal curve passing through the  coordinate points may be written parametrically in this way.

Properties
The rational normal curve has an assortment of nice properties:
This property distinguishes the rational normal curve from all other curves.
 The tangent and secant lines of a rational normal curve are pairwise disjoint, except at points of the curve itself. This is a property shared by sufficiently positive embeddings of any projective variety.
 There are

independent quadrics that generate the ideal of the curve.
 The canonical mapping for a hyperelliptic curve has image a rational normal curve, and is 2-to-1.
 Every irreducible non-degenerate curve  of degree  is a rational normal curve.

See also

Rational normal scroll

References
 Joe Harris, Algebraic Geometry, A First Course, (1992) Springer-Verlag, New York. 

Algebraic curves
Birational geometry